Albert Linder Vincent (December 23, 1906 – December 14, 2000) was an American professional baseball player, manager, coach and scout.  A second baseman, his playing and managing careers were confined to minor league baseball, but he spent 12 seasons in Major League Baseball as a coach for four clubs.

Vincent was also a prominent figure as a college baseball coach. He was assistant baseball coach at Lamar University from 1974 to 1989 and was inducted into Lamar's "Cardinals Hall of Honor" in 1981. Lamar University's Vincent-Beck Stadium is named after him.

His brother was American composer, conductor and music educator John Vincent.

Major League coaching career
Detroit Tigers (1943–1944)
Baltimore Orioles (1955–1959)
Philadelphia Phillies (1961–1963)
Kansas City Athletics (1966–1967)

Minor league managing career
Beaumont Exporters (1937–1940; 1953) – won league championship in 1938
Buffalo Bisons (1941–1942)
Dallas Rebels (1946–1947) – won league championship in 1946
Tulsa Oilers (1948–1951) – won league championship in 1949
Birmingham Barons (1952)
Fort Worth Cats (1954)
Miami Marlins (1960)

External links

1906 births
2000 deaths
Alexandria Reds players
Atlanta Braves scouts
Baltimore Orioles coaches
Baton Rouge Solons players
Beaumont Exporters players
Birmingham Barons managers
Buffalo Bisons (minor league) managers
Buffalo Bisons (minor league) players
Dallas Rebels players
Detroit Tigers coaches
Detroit Tigers scouts
Hazleton Mountaineers players
Houston Astros scouts
Kansas City Athletics coaches
Kinston Eagles players
Lamar Cardinals baseball coaches
Major League Baseball first base coaches
Major League Baseball hitting coaches
Major League Baseball third base coaches
Philadelphia Phillies coaches
Pine Bluff Judges players
Selma Cloverleafs players
Shreveport Sports players
Baseball players from Birmingham, Alabama
Talladega Indians players
Toledo Mud Hens players
Tulsa Oilers (baseball) players
Vicksburg Hill Billies players